Carrigaline United Association Football Club is an Irish association football (soccer) club based in Carrigaline, County Cork. As of 2022, the club's men's team plays in the Munster Senior League Senior Premier Division.

History

The club was founded in 1972, and originally played at the Pottery Field, today the site of the Carrigaline Court Hotel. They moved to Ballea Park in 1985. A new clubhouse, bar and changing rooms was opened in 2004 and an all-weather pitch in 2012.

In 2011, a "Football for All" program was established, allowing access to team sport for young people aged 6–18 with disabilities and neurodivergence.

Carrigaline United have qualified for the FAI Cup on several occasions, including in 2006 and 2009. Their first appearance was in the 2006 FAI Cup, in which they reached the last 32. The club competed in the FAI Intermediate Cup in 2022.

Ground

The club grounds are Ballea Park, located in the west of Carrigaline.

Notable players
 Stephen Carroll
 Aaron Drinan

References

External links
 Official page (archived version from 2019)

Association football clubs in County Cork